Adam Pearson may refer to:

Adam Pearson (sports executive) (born 1964), Hull football and rugby clubs
Adam Pearson (actor) (born 1985), British actor
Adam Pearson, guitarist with The Sisters of Mercy and others